Artie Vierkant (born 1986) is an American digital artist based in Brooklyn, New York, known for his "Image Objects" series. The series is based on the 2010 essay "The Image Object Post-Internet", which he wrote while in graduate school. The series began in 2011 and, as of 2019, is still ongoing. Each work in the series is first created by Vierkant as a digital file on a computer, which he then UV prints out and fits onto a three-dimensional sculpture. As Emily Dubovoy noted in a 2012 Vice article about the series, "...there’s more to it than just the physical objects that one would view in a gallery. The series has another portion to it that lives in, you guessed it, the internet." In 2013, Vierkant began a series called "Exploits", in which he attempts to stretch the limits of what works of art violate intellectual property laws. In 2018, he released a virtual reality app based on the Image Objects series to coincide with the debut of his exhibition "Rooms greet people by name" at Galerie Perrotin, a European art gallery with its Manhattan branch on the Lower East Side. In a 2018 article in Garage, Paddy Johnson wrote that Vierkant's "...work is distinct from that of colleagues such as Petra Cortright, Michael Staniak, and Michael Manning, all of whom take a more intuitive approach. By contrast, Vierkant is the classic conceptualist, fixated on the distinction between the object and its documentation, and theorizing — in classic Baudrillardian fashion — that representation can exist without reference to an original." Vierkant is also the co-host of the podcast Death Panel, and the co-author (with Beatrice Adler-Bolton) of Health Communism, which was published by Verso Books in October 2022.

References

External links

Living people
1986 births
People from Brainerd, Minnesota
University of Pennsylvania alumni
University of California, San Diego alumni
American digital artists
Artists from Minnesota
Artists from Brooklyn
American conceptual artists
21st-century American artists
American male artists